Mary Salifu Boforo (born 25 February 1951) is a former Ghanaian Member of Parliament for the Savelugu Constituency in the Northern Region of Ghana.
She served as Member of Parliament from 1996 until 2017, but lost out in the primaries to contest in the 2016 election.

Early life 
Mary Salifu Boforo was born on 25 February 1951 in Savelugu, in the Northern Region of Ghana. . Before becoming a member of parliament, she owned a bakery and farming business; and also worked in the banking industry. She had vocational training at National Vocational Training Institute in 1972.

Political life
Since January 1997, she has been the Member of Parliament for the Savelugu constituency. In 2014, she became First Deputy Majority Chief Whip. She is currently the longest serving Member of Parliament, but in 2016 while attempting to be selected for her constituency for the sixth time, she lost in the primary vote to Alhassan Abdulai Red. This means that she will leave Parliament in 2017. She commented after the vote that this could have the effect of suppressing the views of women in the Northern Region.

Boforo is a strong advocate for the empowerment of women and children affairs as she served on the Ghana Developing Communities Association as the lead Advocate and Chairperson of Ghana’s Parliamentary Women's Caucus. She became well known in Ghana after she published a report in Parliament which stated "The fight for equality between men and women goes beyond the case made for social justice but rather a fundamental human right that must be achieved." Despite losing her seat, she advocated a greater role for women in leading West Africa and said that what she had managed to achieve in her region was evidence that women could improve the infrastructure for the betterment of the people.

1996 Elections 
Boforo was first voted into parliament on 7 January 1997 after she was pronounced winner at the 1996 Ghanaian General Elections. She defeated Alhassan Abudulai Abubakari of the New Patriotic Party and Bawa Muhammed Baba of the Convention People's Party by obtaining 50.90% of the total valid votes cast which is equivalent to 14,971 votes while her counterparts both shared 19.00% and 7.20% which is equivalent to 5,585 votes and 2,108 votes respectively.

Personal life 
She is married with four children. Boforo is a practising Muslim.

References 

Living people
1951 births
Women members of the Parliament of Ghana
Ghanaian MPs 1997–2001
Ghanaian MPs 2001–2005
Ghanaian MPs 2005–2009
Ghanaian MPs 2009–2013
Ghanaian MPs 2013–2017
National Democratic Congress (Ghana) politicians
Ghanaian Muslims
People from Northern Region (Ghana)
21st-century Ghanaian women politicians